"The Comeback" is the second single, released on April 28, 2017, from Danny Gokey's fourth album, Rise.

Composition
"The Comeback" is originally in the key of A, with a tempo of 118 beats per minute.

Music video 
A lyric video was released on April 13, 2017. The video has over seven million views on YouTube.

Charts

Weekly charts

Year-end charts

References 

2017 singles
2017 songs
Danny Gokey songs
BMG Rights Management singles
Songs written by Danny Gokey